The Bulgar Mosque is a mosque in the city of Cheboksary, Chuvashia, Russia. It is located on the outskirts of the city. Russian Grand Mufti Talgat Tadzhuddin opened it on September 14, 2005.

The mosque is named after the medieval Volga-Bulgarian capital of Bolghar, and is a revered center of Islam in the Volga region.

See also
Islam in Russia
List of mosques in Russia
List of mosques in Europe

References

External links
 Photos of the Bulgar Mosque in Cheboksary

Mosques in Russia
Cheboksary
Mosques completed in 2005
21st-century mosques
Religious buildings and structures in Chuvashia
Mosques in Europe